Boston City Council elections were held on November 3, 2015. Eight seats (four district representatives and four at-large members) were contested in the general election, as the incumbents in districts 1, 2, 6, 8, and 9 were unopposed. Two seats (districts 4 and 7) had also been contested in the preliminary election held on September 8, 2015.

At-large
Councillors Ayanna Pressley, Michelle Wu, and Michael F. Flaherty were re-elected, while Councillor Stephen J. Murphy lost his seat to Annissa Essaibi George.

 write-in votes

District 1
Councillor Salvatore LaMattina ran unopposed and was re-elected.

District 2
Councillor Bill Linehan ran unopposed and was re-elected.

 write-in votes

District 3
Councillor Frank Baker was re-elected.

District 4
Councillor Charles Yancey was defeated by Andrea Campbell.

District 5
Councillor Timothy McCarthy was re-elected.

District 6
Councillor Matt O'Malley ran unopposed and was re-elected.

District 7
Councillor Tito Jackson was re-elected.

 write-in votes

District 8
Councillor Josh Zakim ran unopposed and was re-elected.

District 9
Councillor Mark Ciommo ran unopposed and was re-elected.

See also
 List of members of Boston City Council

References

Further reading

External links
 2015 Election Results at boston.gov
 Boston City Council Swearing In 2016 at cityofboston.gov (January 4, 2016)

City Council election
Boston City Council elections
Boston City Council election
Boston City Council